Chả lụa (() or giò lụa is the most common type of sausage in Vietnamese cuisine, made of pork and traditionally wrapped in banana leaves.

Production and consumption

Traditionally, chả lụa is made of lean pork, potato starch, garlic, ground black pepper, and fish sauce. The pork has to be pounded into a paste; it cannot be chopped or ground, as the meat would still be fibrous, dry, and crumbly. Near the end of the pounding period, a few spoonfuls of fish paste are added to the meat for flavor. Salt, black pepper, and sugar can also be added. The meat is now called giò sống, meaning "raw sausage", and can also be used in other dishes than sausages. 

The mixture is then wrapped tightly in banana leaves into a cylindrical shape and boiled. If the banana leaf is not wrapped tightly and water leaks inside while it is being boiled, the sausage will spoil quickly if kept at room temperature. The sausage has to be submerged vertically into boiling water; a 1 kg sausage typically takes an hour to cook. 

Other variants include:
 chả bì – containing shredded pork skin along with typical chả lụa ingredients, then steamed
 chả bò – beef sausage with herbs
 chả chiên – where the entire sausage is deep-fried (instead of steamed, omitting the banana leaf wrap)
 chả Huế – contains whole black peppercorns and more garlic and then steamed
 chả quế – sausage seasoned with powdered cinnamon, then fried, another variety of chả chiên. In Northern Vietnam, chả almost exclusively refers to this variant
Correctly made chả lụa can be stored at room temperature for about one week. Refrigerated storage is preferable; it will keep for 3 to 4 weeks.

Many Vietnamese started immigrating to the United States in the mid-1970s. Banana leaves are not readily available in the US, so Vietnamese chefs made chả lụa wrapped in aluminum foil. Where banana leaves are available a small strip of leaf is used for flavor, while still using aluminum foil to shape the sausage.

The sausage is normally sliced and eaten with bánh cuốn, bánh mì, or xôi, or braised in fish sauce and black pepper with other meat dishes. If fried, it is called chả chiên.

References

Vietnamese sausages
Pork dishes
Vietnamese beef dishes
Vietnamese cuisine
Vietnamese pork dishes